Newtown Presbyterian Church, also known as Old Presbyterian Church of Newtown, is a historic Presbyterian church complex and national historic district in Newtown, Bucks County, Pennsylvania.

This old edifice is the second of four Presbyterian Church buildings erected in Newtown.  The first was built in 1734, and William Tennent, the first minister, preached there one Sunday a month.  The first pastor to be installed in Newtown took office in 1752. The church was erected in 1769 and remodeled in 1842. It is a 2 1/2-story, rectangular stone building in the Greek Revival style.  A porch and two vestibules were added about 1880.

In December 1776, because it was one of the largest buildings in town, General George Washington commandeered it and used it as a hospital, a jail and a P.O.W. “camp.”  After the Battle of Trenton, several hundred Hessians were held there before they began their long march to Philadelphia where they would be exchanged for American soldiers.

The small building on the south side of the church is the Session House.  It was built about 1800, and is a 1 1/2-story, rubble fieldstone structure.  It was used as a meeting place for the session, and is one of only two such buildings in the county still standing.  Because most early session members were farmers and did not get to town except on Sunday, the Session House provided a quiet place for conducting church business.

In back of the church is the church cemetery.  It includes eight British flags marking the graves of men who fought in the French and Indian Wars.  There are twenty-eight flags flying over the graves of church members who followed General Washington in the American Revolution. The graveyard is partially surrounded by a stone wall.

It was listed on the National Register of Historic Places in July 1987.

Gallery

References

External links
Newtown Presbyterian Church website

Churches on the National Register of Historic Places in Pennsylvania
Historic districts in Bucks County, Pennsylvania
Churches completed in 1769
Presbyterian churches in Pennsylvania
Churches in Bucks County, Pennsylvania
Historic districts on the National Register of Historic Places in Pennsylvania
18th-century Presbyterian church buildings in the United States
National Register of Historic Places in Bucks County, Pennsylvania